GWR 4900 Class 4-6-0 No. 4979 Wootton Hall is a steam locomotive. It was built at Swindon, February 1930, and was one of 258 Hall class steam locomotives constructed.

Its first shed allocation was Plymouth Laira and after 32 years of service it ended up at Oxford. During this time it was allocated to sheds in Penzance, Tyseley, Severn Tunnel Junction, Cardiff Canton, and ended its days in the London Division of the Western Region of British Railways, based at Southall, Reading, Didcot and finally Oxford in July 1958. It was used for a variety of duties including fast passenger service and freight.

It was withdrawn from service in December 1963 and acquired by Woodham Brothers scrapyard in Barry, South Wales, in June 1964.

Allocations & History

The locations of 4979 on particular dates. (UNFINISHED)

Preservation 

4979 is one of several Halls salvaged from Woodhams' Scrapyard.  It was sold to Fleetwood Locomotive Centre in Lancashire, and left as the 179th departure from Barry in October 1986. 

In 1994 it was purchased by the Furness Railway Trust and moved to storage at the Lytham Motive Power Museum. In March 2007 it was again moved to a new storage site at Appleby where, during its time at the Heritage Centre there, preventative maintenance was carried out to prevent further decay on the locomotive but the years of being by the sea air at Barry and Fleetwood has taken its toll.

Once the FRT's new accommodation in Preston was completed, 4979 was moved from Appleby in October 2014, to the Ribble Steam Railway at Preston where restoration has since begun. The tender tank was almost immediately removed and is now sat in the yard awaiting eventual disposal (but remains as a template for the new tender tank). As many re-usable parts as possible have also been recovered from the remains of the tender frames for eventual re-use on the locomotives restored tender. The remains of the locos drag box have been cut away for replacement and a number of small parts from the loco are also being worked on. The long-term goal for the FRT is to restore the locomotives tender first and then when the tender is completed and funding has been raised, restore Wootton Hall to her former glory.

References

External links 

 

4979
Railway locomotives introduced in 1930
4979
Locomotives saved from Woodham Brothers scrapyard
Standard gauge steam locomotives of Great Britain
4-6-0 locomotives